The Loup City Township Carnegie Library is a historic building in Loup City, Nebraska. It was built as a Carnegie library in 1917 by John Ohlson & Sons after members of the community applied for a grant from the Carnegie Corporation. The cornerstone was laid by the Grand Lodge of Nebraska in January 1917, and the library was dedicated on September 3, 1917. The building was designed in the Classical Revival style by Fiske & Meginnis. It has been listed on the National Register of Historic Places since December 27, 2007.

References

External links

Carnegie libraries in Nebraska
National Register of Historic Places in Sherman County, Nebraska
Neoclassical architecture in Nebraska
Library buildings completed in 1917